Celestine Donkor is a Ghanaian gospel musician and songwriter. In March 2021, she was among the Top 30 Most Influential Women in Music by the 3Music Awards Women's Brunch. She founded the Celestial Praise, an annual Gospel music concert.

Early life and education  
Donkor was born to the family of Mr and Mrs Akakpo, both from the Volta region of Ghana. She started her primary school education at St Augustine Preparatory school in Abeka Lapaz and continued to Nsaaniya Secondary Business School at Kasoa where she had her secondary school education. She proceeded to the University of Ghana, Legon where she obtained her BA (Hons) Sociology and Information studies.

Music career 
Donkor collaborated with numerous gospel musicians, including Joe Mettle, Joyce Blessing, Ceccy Twum, Mkhululi Bhebhe, Edem, Philipa Baafi, Funny Face. She has many hit songs, including "Turning around", "Bigger", "Okronkronhene", "Manim Nguase", "Boobobo". Her latest Album Agbebolo earned her the Artiste of the year at the National Gospel Music Awards.

Personal life 
She married Mr Donkor with whom she has three daughters.

Discography

Albums 

Gye Wadea (2007)
Restoration (2010)
Righteousness (2015)
Turning Around (2015)
Okronkronhene (2018)
Bread of life (2019)

Awards and nominations

References 

Ghanaian women musicians
Living people
Year of birth missing (living people)
Ghanaian gospel singers
University of Ghana alumni
People from Volta Region